Alexander Abraham Matossian (born 20th-century) is a Lebanese politician from Tashnag, and a former member of the Parliament of Lebanon.

See also 

 List of members of the 2018–2022 Lebanese Parliament

References 

Living people
21st-century Lebanese politicians
Lebanese people of Armenian descent
Armenian Revolutionary Federation politicians
Members of the Parliament of Lebanon
Year of birth missing (living people)